The Chesterfield Building is a 1965-erected high-rise 200 foot tall, 20-story apartment building complex located in the Reserve Square area of downtown Cleveland. The building was designed by Charles Luckman who is responsible for the Aon Center (Los Angeles), the Los Angeles Convention Center, the Madison Square Garden in New York and the AmTrust Financial Center in Cleveland among many others. The complex contains 407 living units and features distinctive windows that open out giving the impression that the building is an old factory, but the building has always been apartments. The Chesterfield features a roof-top swimming pool and underwent major cosmetic (exterior) renovation in 2001.

In 2011, building management were alerted of their having 78 code violations, including structural issues, plumbing problems, foundation fissures, and lack of pest control. The building was later rebranded "The Sphere" and renovated.

See also
 List of tallest buildings in Cleveland
 Charles Luckman

References

Residential skyscrapers in Cleveland
Apartment buildings in Cleveland
Buildings and structures in Cleveland
Residential buildings completed in 1967
1965 architecture
Charles Luckman buildings